The Church of St Peter ad Vincula, Folkington, East Sussex is a parish church dating from the 13th century. Built of flint and rubble, it is a Grade I listed building and an active parish church.

History
The origins of the church are 13th century. The interior contains some 18th century funerary monuments, which Pevsner considers "very grand" for their modest setting, and a set of panelled box pews and pulpit. 
The church was lightly restored in 1870. The organ dates from 1917, and was a gift of  Mary Earle Gwynne of Folkington, in memory of the men of the village who died in World War I. It remains an active parish church.

The graveyard contains the grave of the cookery writer Elizabeth David, marked by a slate headstone carved in 1992 by local stonemason Geoffrey Aldred.

Just inside the door, on the left-hand side wall is a small stone relief sculpture, commissioned by the family of Ronald Stacy Marks, by John Skelton (sculptor).

Architecture and description
The church is constructed of flint and rubble. The bell turret is weatherboarded, with a "shingled spirelet". The building is listed Grade I.

Notes

References
 

Church of St Peter, Folkington
Flint buildings
Church of England church buildings in East Sussex